The Peterbald is a cat breed of Russian origin. It was created in St Petersburg in 1994 from an experimental breeding by Olga S. Mironova. They resemble Oriental Shorthairs with a hair-losing gene. The breed  was accepted for Championship class competition in 2009.

Description

Appearance
Peterbalds resemble Oriental Shorthairs.  They have a hair-losing gene and can be born bald, flocked, velour, brush, or with a straight coat. Those born with hair, excepting the straight-coats, can lose their hair over time. They come in all colors and markings.

Members of the breed have a slim and muscular build. They have a narrow and long head with a straight profile, almond-shaped eyes, wedge-shaped muzzle, and large, set-apart ears. They have a long whip-like tail, webbed feet and oval paws that allow them to grasp objects and open levered doorknobs.

Temperament
Peterbalds are sweet-tempered, affectionate, peaceful, curious, smart, and energetic. They are medium vocal and tend to follow their owners and want to be with them. Peterbalds typically live in harmony with other cats and pets, and also with children.

History

The Peterbald breed was born during the latter half of 1994 in St. Petersburg, Russia, the result of an experimental mating of a Don Hairless (also known as Don Sphynx, Donskoy or Donsky) male named Afinogen Myth and an Oriental Shorthair female World Champion named Radma von Jagerhov, by Russian felinologist Olga S. Mironova. The first two litters produced four Peterbald kittens: Mandarin iz Murino, Muscat iz Murino, Nezhenka iz Murino and Nocturne iz Murino. These four Peterbalds were the founders of the breed.

In 1996, the breed was adopted in the Russian Selectional Feline Federation (SFF) and given a standard and an abbreviation (PBD). In 1997 it was adopted in The International Cat Association (TICA) with the  abbreviation PD, and in 2003 in the World Cat Federation (WCF) with the abbreviation PBD. Other used handles of the breed are PTB, PD and PSX.

These days the breed develops in the direction of modern Oriental and Siamese types, that is to say a long muzzle, large set-apart ears, flat cheekbones, and an elegant body on long legs. Therefore, all standards for this breed encourage mating with Oriental and Siamese cats and semi-longhair variations of those (such as Balinese and Javanese).  The Balinese and Javanese were eliminated from the acceptable outcross list in 2005.  

The Peterbald was accepted for Championship class competition, effective May 1, 2009, in the American Cat Fanciers Association (ACFA) in August 2008. Effective May 2008, TICA recognizes the "brush coat" Peterbald for Championship competition.

See also
 Donskoy (cat) 
 Sphynx cat
 Elf cat

External links

Cat breeds
Mammals of Russia
Cat breeds originating in Russia
Hairless cat breeds
Rare cat breeds